Chillu Kottaram is a 1985 Indian Malayalam film,  directed by K. G. Rajasekharan. The film stars Srividya, Sukumaran, Balan K. Nair and Jalaja in the lead roles. The film has musical score by A. T. Ummer. It was a commercial success. It also became the first Malayalam film to run for 100 days in Andhra Pradesh.

Cast
Srividya
Sukumaran
Balan K. Nair
Jalaja
Kunchan
Kuthiravattam Pappu

Soundtrack
The music was composed by A. T. Ummer and the lyrics were written by Poovachal Khader.

See also
 List of Malayalam films of 1985

References

External links
 

1985 films
1980s Malayalam-language films
Films directed by K. G. Rajasekharan